The Battle-Road is a vertically scrolling vehicular combat game released in arcades by Irem in 1984. The player controls a car armed with two types of guns (frontal and side) and drives on a road full of other dangerous vehicles such as cars, motorcycles, trucks and helicopters. It has branching paths resulting in 32 possible routes.

Reception 
In Japan, Game Machine listed The Battle-Road on their November 15, 1984 issue as being the seventh most-successful table arcade unit of the month.

References

1984 video games
Arcade video games
Arcade-only video games
Irem games
Top-down racing video games
Vehicular combat games
Video games developed in Japan